Lupita D'Alessio (born Guadalupe Contreras Ramos on 10 March 1954 in (Mexico City, México) is a Mexican singer and actress. She is nicknamed La Leona Dormida (a title of one of her songs, which translates to "The sleeping lioness").

Biography
She started her career in showbusiness with her father Poncho D'Alessio, who had a musical show called La Familia D'Alessio on a Tijuana television station. She then moved to Mexico City and released a single "Mi Corazón es un Gitano", a cover of the Italian song "Il Cuore è Uno Zingaro" which won the Sanremo Music Festival, both in 1971. Then she was selected to perform the theme song of the telenovela of Televisa titled Mundo de juguete. She was invited to take roles on Ana del Aire and other productions in the 1970s and 1980s. Lupita sang the title song of telenovela Pacto de  Amor, where she also acted.

In 1978, she won the Mexican national final to select the country's entrant in the seventh edition of the OTI Festival which was held in Santiago, Chile. Her entry, entitled "Como tú" (Just like you) was received with critical acclaim and as a result she got the third place in the contest. This fact helped her to consolidate her musical career in Mexico.

In 1980, Lupita was one of the main characters in Ernesto Alonso's Aprendiendo a Amar, where she played the role of her older daughter (the younger daughter was played by Erika Buenfil). The telenovela starred Susana Dosamantes (mother of Paulina Rubio). Lupita also sang the theme song "A Mí". She performed concerts on tour in Central and South America.

In 1986, Lupita starred in the movie Mentiras alongside Juan Ferrara, where she played Lupita Montero, an aspiring singer; she performed several songs for the soundtrack of the movie, including "Mudanzas". In 1987, she appeared in the short telenovela Tiempo De Amar, alongside Fernando Allende. Her last project of the 1980s was 1989's "Quién te crees tú", the theme to her last finished acting project, the telenovela Lo Blanco y lo Negro.

In 2000, she accepted a telenovela role in TV Azteca's  Ellas, inocentes o culpables, although she left the production after a month.  She returned to Televisa in 2002 for a guest appearance on the situation comedy La Jaula with Cesar Bono, Carlos Eduardo Rico, and Sheyla Tadeo.

For her work in television and as a recording artist, D'Alessio has her handprints and star embedded on the Paseo de las Luminarias in Mexico City.

In 2011, she participated as a critic in several episodes of Parodiando.

In 2018, she starred in her own biography on the miniseries Hoy voy a Cambiar, adding another number one hit together with the song Yo Sigo Aqui.

Films
 Mentiras (1986) as Lupita Montero
 Siempre en Domingo (1983) as Lupita D'Alessio

Telenovelas
 Ellas, inocentes o culpables (2000) as Amanda
 Lo blanco y lo negro (1989) as Verónica Montes
 Tiempo de amar (1987) as Carolina Montero
 Aprendiendo a amar (1980) as Jimena
 Pacto de amor (1977) as Julia
 Paloma (1975) as Dora Luz
 Ana del aire (1974) as Consuelo
 Cartas sin Destino (1973)

Theater
 La novicia rebelde (The Sound of Music)

Albums
 Yo Sigo Aquí: Zona Preferente [En Vivo] (2017)
 Cuando se ama como tú (2013)
 La gira del adiós/En vivo (2007)
 El adiós (2006)
 Cuando el amor te besa (2004)
 Para Toda La Vida (2002)
 Estoy aquí (2000)
 Si yo pudiera detener el tiempo (1997)
 Desde mi libertad (1995)
 La D'Alessio (1993)
 Desde Mi Libertad (1994)
 La D'Alessio (1993)
 Tiempo De Amar (1981)
 Aprendiendo a Amar (1980)
 Gaviota del Aire
 Boleros De Siempre
 Soy Como Toda Mujer
 Lo Blanco y Lo Negro (1989)
 Juro Que Nunca Volveré
 Cuentos De Los Bosques De Viena
 Discothèque
 Lo mejor con la mejor
 Otra vez
 Que se detenga el tiempo

See also
 Paquita la del Barrio

External links
 Lupita D'Alessio at the telenovela database
 
  October 2009+04:07:51  Biography
  Profile on esmas.com
  Zarpasos y rugidos de la leona on univision.com
  Lupita
  

1954 births
Living people
Mexican film actresses
Mexican telenovela actresses
Mexican women singers
Ballad musicians
People from Tijuana
Actresses from Baja California
Singers from Baja California
Converts to Christianity
Mexican Christians
Mexico in the OTI Festival
Latin Grammy Lifetime Achievement Award winners
Women in Latin music